Bahrum Daido (30 September 1964 – 2 January 2021) was an Indonesian politician who served as member of parliament for period 2009–2019.

Daido was member of Democrat Party and in 2004, he was elected together with Basmin Mattayang to become Regent and vice-regent of Luwu. In 2008, he became regent replacing Mattayang until 2009. After he served as Regent of Luwu, he was elected as MP and elected again in 2014. In 2019, he was not elected for the third time.

Daido died from COVID-19 on 2 January 2021, during the COVID-19 pandemic in Indonesia.

References

1964 births
2021 deaths
People from Palopo
Deaths from the COVID-19 pandemic in Indonesia
Democratic Party (Indonesia) politicians